Dengie nature reserve is a 12 sq. mi. (3,105 hectare) biological and geological Site of Special Scientific Interest between the estuaries of the Blackwater and Crouch near Bradwell-on-Sea in Essex. It is also a National Nature Reserve, a Special Protection Area, a Nature Conservation Review site, a Geological Conservation Review site and a Ramsar site. It is part of the Essex estuaries Special Area of Conservation. An area of 30 acres (12 hectares) is the Bradwell Shell Bank nature reserve, which is managed by the Essex Wildlife Trust.

It consists of large, remote area of tidal mud-flats and salt marshes at the eastern end of the Dengie peninsula . The Chapel of St Peter-on-the-Wall overlooks some of the site.

It is a wetland of international importance and provides habitats for:
Bar-tailed godwit (Limosa lapponica)
Hen harrier (Circus cyaneus)
Grey plover (Pluvialis squatarola)
knot (Calidris canutus)
Black-tailed godwit (Limosa limosa islandica)
Dunlin (Calidris alpina alpina)
Lapwing (Vanellus vanellus)
Oystercatcher (Haematopus ostralegus)
Dark-bellied brent goose (Branta bernicla bernicla)
Cormorant (Phalacrocorax carbo)
Great crested grebe (Podiceps cristatus)

References

Special Protection Areas in England
Sites of Special Scientific Interest in Essex
Nature Conservation Review sites
Coastal environment of Essex
Ramsar sites in England
National nature reserves in England
Geological Conservation Review sites